Jazz a Confronto 27 is an album by jazz saxophonist Archie Shepp recorded in Rome, Italy, on September 28. 1975, and released on the Horo Records label as part of the "Jazz a Confronto" series.

Track listing
All compositions by Archie Shepp
 "Libya" - 21:20
 "My Heart Cries Out to Africa" - 19:03
Recorded in Rome, Italy on September 28, 1975

Personnel
Archie Shepp - tenor saxophone, soprano saxophone
Charles Greenlee - trombone
Dave Burrell - piano
David Williams - bass
Beaver Harris - drums

References

1976 albums
Archie Shepp albums
Horo Records albums